High Gardham is a small hamlet in the East Riding of Yorkshire, England. It lies to the south of the A1079 road.

High Gardham forms part of the civil parish of Cherry Burton.

References

Villages in the East Riding of Yorkshire